E61 may refer to:
 Nokia E61, a smartphone
 BMW E60/E61, an automobile platform
 European route E61, an international road route
 E-61, a commercial espresso machine introduced by Faema in 1961
 King's Indian Defence, Encyclopaedia of Chess Openings code
 An ICD code for "Deficiency of other nutrient elements"
 Dōtō Expressway (spur road to Ashoro IC), Tokachi-Okhotsk Expressway and Bihoro Bypass, route E61 in Japan